Thomas is an unincorporated community in Daviess County, Indiana, in the United States.

History
Thomas was named in honor of a family of settlers.

References

Unincorporated communities in Daviess County, Indiana
Unincorporated communities in Indiana